Michale Boganim  is a French-Israeli screenwriter and film director. Her feature-length films include La Terre outragée (2011) or Odessa, Odessa (2005).

Life and career
Boganim was born  the 17 of July 1977  in  Haifa to a Modern Orthodox Jewish family with ancestors from the Ukraine on her mother's side. She grew up in France where her family had emigrated  in 1984 following the 1982 Lebanon conflict She studied political science and anthropology at the Sorbonne in Paris under Jean Rouch and then completed a degree in sociology, philosophy, and history at the Hebrew University of Jerusalem. After graduating, she returned to Paris and worked as an assistant  producer  and  director for several film companies. Boganim went on to study film techniques and directing, first at the Institut National Supérieur des Arts du Spectacle in Belgium for a brief period and then at the prestigious  National Film and Television School in the UK, where she graduated in 2000.

Dust and Mémoires incertaines (Dim Memories), two of her short documentary films made at the National Film School, would later form the basis for Odessa, Odessa, her first feature-length film. Mémoires incertaines was presented at the Directors' Fortnight of the 2002 Cannes Festival, where it won the Prix Gras-Savoye. Dust won the International Film Critics prize at the 2002 Krakow Film Festival and the Best Short Documentary award at the Leeds International Film Festival. Her feature-length documentary Odessa, Odessa was released in 2005 and shown at numerous film festivals including Sundance and the Berlin Film Festival where it was awarded the CICAE Prize. It follows the lives and reminiscences of elderly Russian Jews who remained behind in Odessa after World War II and those who took up a life as exiles in Ashdod, Israel and the Brighton Beach neighborhood of Brooklyn.

Boganim's first feature-length fiction film, La Terre outragée (Land of Oblivion) was premiered at the Venice Film Festival in 2011. and Toronto film festival, Chicago film festival, Palm Spring, San Francisco, Tokyo etc.  Starring Olga Kurylenko and Andrzej Chyra, it was filmed in Pripyat which had been rendered a ghost city by the Chernobyl disaster in 1986. The film was positively reviewed in the French press, including the Cahiers du Cinéma, won several awards, and was broadcast on European television. Boganim's first English-language film Lost in America is in pre-production as of 2018. The film is a coming-of-age drama set in Manhattan and the Hassidic community of Brooklyn's Borough Park.

Filmography
2000 Dust, (35 minutes) as director and screenwriter, documentary on the remnants of Yiddish culture in Odessa, National Film and Television School production 
2001 Mémoires incertaines (Dim Memories) (35 minutes), as director and screenwriter, documentary on Boganim's search for the real identity of her mysterious great uncle with each member of the family telling a different story about him, National Film and Television School production  
2004 Macao sans retour (Last Stop, Macau) (52 minutes), as director, documentary on Macau, French/Portuguese co-production, selected for the 2005 Rotterdam Film Festival
2004 Odessa, Odessa (102 minutes), as director and screenwriter, documentary on the lives of Jewish exiles from Odessa and those who remained in the city, premiered at the Jerusalem Film Festival. French/Israeli co-production
2006 Bienvenue chez Dovid (26 minutes), as director, documentary on Yiddish researcher and linguist Dovid Katz filmed in Lithuania and Belarus for the Arte television series Visages d'Europe. The film received a "Mention spécial" at the 2007 Doc en Courts festival in Lyon. 
2008 Bienvenue chez Renata (26 minutes) as director, documentary on a cafe in Gdańsk for the Arte television series Visages d'Europe.  A portrait of twin sister waitresses at a Gdańsk Shipyard Cafe.
2012  La Terre outragée (Land of Oblivion) (108 minutes), as director and screenwriter, drama set in Pripyat exploring the Chernobyl disaster and its aftermath, premiered at the Venice Film Festival, French/German/Polish/Ukraine co-production.
 2021 The Forgotten Ones (93 minutes) as director and screenwriter, documentary, Michale Boganim follows the footsteps of her father, who came from Morocco and quickly became a leader of the local Israeli Black Panthers to stand against this discrimination. Giornate degli Autori 2021  – Venice (World Premiere), Cinemed 2021 (French Premiere), Doc NYC 2021 (North American Premiere), CPH:Dox 2022
 2022 Tel Aviv Beirut (116 minutes) as director and screenwriter,  historical drama set against the backdrop of the Israeli-Lebanese conflict in 1982 and 2006 – Premiered at Tokyo International Film Festival

Notes

References

External links 
Radio Free Europe (2 April 2012).  "Lights! Camera! Hazmat Suit! Filming Inside Chornobyl's Exclusion Zone".
Video interview with Michale Bogadim (in English) on the official YouTube channel of the Sarajevo Film Festival
Trailer for Odessa, Odessa on the official YouTube channel of UniFrance  

1972 births
Living people
People from Haifa
Israeli film directors
French women film directors
Israeli women film directors
Israeli documentary film directors
French documentary film directors
French women screenwriters
Israeli female screenwriters
Women documentary filmmakers